The 30th Connecticut Colored Infantry Regiment, United States Colored Troops, was an infantry unit that existed briefly during the American Civil War.

History
The 30th Connecticut Colored Infantry Regiment was raised from 400 excess volunteers of 1,200 who had responded in the autumn and winter of 1863 to a call by Governor Buckingham for recruits to the 29th Connecticut Colored Infantry Regiment. The two regiments were raised side-by-side in the Fair Haven area of New Haven, Connecticut, where they were addressed by Frederick Douglass on 29 January 1864. Although the 29th would go on to serve in the war, the 30th was merged into the 31st Infantry Regiment on 18 May 1864.

See also
List of Connecticut Civil War units

References

African-American military units and formations of the American Civil War
Units and formations of the Union Army from Connecticut
Military units and formations disestablished in 1864
Military units and formations established in 1864
1864 establishments in Connecticut